"Perfect Love" is a song written by Sunny Russ and Stephony Smith, and recorded by American country music artist Trisha Yearwood. It was released in January 1998 as the third and final single from her compilation album (Songbook) A Collection of Hits. The song reached the top of the US Billboard Hot Country Singles & Tracks chart.

Critical reception
Deborah Evans Price, of Billboard magazine reviewed the song favorably, calling it an "infectious, uptempo tune that celebrates the joys of being in love." She goes on to say that Yearwood delivers the song with "her usual passion and vibrancy."

Music video
The music video was directed by Gerry Wenner and premiered in January 1998. It shows Yearwood performing the song in a vintage novelty shop, and a young couple, an elderly couple, and two kids walking through the shop, trying on clothes, dancing, and looking at the toys and pictures that eventually come to life.

Chart positions
"Perfect Love" debuted at number 61 on the U.S. Billboard Hot Country Singles & Tracks for the week of January 17, 1998.

Year-end charts

References

1998 singles
1997 songs
Trisha Yearwood songs
Songs written by Sunny Russ
Songs written by Stephony Smith
Song recordings produced by Tony Brown (record producer)
MCA Nashville Records singles